David William McBride (born 1963 or 1964) is an Australian whistleblower and former British Army major and Australian Army lawyer. From 2014 to 2016 McBride provided the Australian Broadcasting Corporation with information about war crimes allegedly committed by Australian soldiers in Afghanistan. The ABC broadcast details in 2017. In 2018, he was charged with several offences related to his whistleblowing, and is awaiting trial. The war crime allegations were reviewed in the Brereton Report.

Early life
McBride was born in 1963 or 1964 to William McBride, an obstetrician in Sydney. He has three siblings.

He graduated in law at the Sydney University and then obtained  a scholarship to take a second degree in the same subject at Oxford University.

Career
McBride joined the British Army and served in Germany before training at the Royal Military Academy Sandhurst and then commanding a Blues and Royals platoon in Northern Ireland. He left the army after failing to complete the entry requirements for the Special Air Service.

After a period in civilian life, including security work in Rwanda and Zaire, a stint as a "tracker" on the 1990s British reality-style television game show, Wanted, as  security adviser to the series Journeys to the Ends of the Earth, and an unsuccessful 2003 attempt to win a New South Wales Legislative Assembly seat representing Coogee, for the Liberal Party, he enlisted in the Australian Army as a lawyer.

He then served two tours of duty in Afghanistan in 2011 and 2013, for which he received a combat services medal. He was medically discharged with post-traumatic stress disorder in 2017.

Leak of alleged war crimes
McBride made internal allegations of war crimes committed by Australian forces in Afghanistan, then subsequently supplied classified information about these allegations to the Australian Broadcasting Corporation. An investigation by Major General Justice Paul Brereton, which began in May 2016 and whose results were made public in November 2020, found "credible information" that war crimes were committed by Australians.

In September 2018, McBride was charged with the theft of Commonwealth property contrary to s 131(1) of the Criminal Code Act 1995; in March 2019 he was charged with a further four offences: three of breaching s 73A(1) of the Defence Act 1903; and another of "unlawfully disclosing a Commonwealth document contrary to s 70(1) of the Crimes Act 1914". McBride pleaded not guilty to each of the charges at a 30 May 2019 preliminary hearing and is awaiting trial. His legal team includes Nick Xenophon and Mark Davis.

In October 2022, it was reported that the case against McBride would proceed to trial. McBride and his lawyers had tried to get the prosecution dropped by applying for protection under Australia's whistleblower laws. This application relied on expert testimony of 2 witnesses. However, the Government moved to quash this testimony (prevent it from being heard) on national security grounds. As such, McBride and his team dropped the application, and the trial would go ahead.

Personal life
McBride has two daughters from a former marriage, to Sarah (née Green). The couple separated in 2016.

Notes

References

Further reading
  - Autobiographical profile with photos

External links
 
 Federal Court charging record
 

21st-century Australian lawyers
Australian whistleblowers
War crimes in Afghanistan
Living people
Year of birth missing (living people)
Australian Army officers
1960s births
University of Sydney alumni
Alumni of the University of Oxford
20th-century British Army personnel
Blues and Royals officers
Graduates of the Royal Military Academy Sandhurst
Australian television presenters
People with post-traumatic stress disorder
Liberal Party of Australia politicians